Gordon Allen Newkirk Jr. (September 12, 1928 – December 21, 1985) was an American astrophysicist.

Newkirk was born in Orange, New Jersey, and grew up in nearby West Orange, living there throughout his youth until he left for college. He was the only child of Mildred (née Fleming) and Gordon Allen Newkirk, who worked as an electrical engineer for Public Service Electric and Gas. West Orange was the home of the Edison Laboratories and Newkirk grew up near the home of Thomas Edison in Llewellyn Park. He attended West Orange High School.

He graduated from Harvard University in 1950 and completed his Ph.D. in astrophysics from the University of Michigan in 1953. In 1955 he began working at the High Altitude Observatory in Boulder, Colorado. From 1968 through 1979, he was director of the High Altitude Observatory (HAO) and associate director of NCAR. He was also a teacher and adjunct professor at the University of Colorado in the Department of AstroGeophysics and the Department of Physics and Astrophysics. He married Nancy Buck in 1956, and raised three daughters in Boulder, Colorado.

Scientific career 

His scientific career was notable for his work as a solar physicist, in particular for his design of instruments for observing the solar corona. His radially-graded coronal camera (first used in Bolivia in 1966) was also used to photograph seven other eclipses. He perfected the Lyot coronagraph over a period of twenty years for use as a space borne telescope. In 1973, he was the principal investigator for experiments on the Skylab spacecraft (while working for HAO).  He published many papers on the solar corona, including "a benchmark depiction of coronal magnetic fields." He also discovered a comet.

References

External links
 Gordon A. Newkirk Jr. Papers, 1949-1985 | National Center for Atmospheric Research (NCAR) 

1928 births
1985 deaths
Harvard University alumni
People from Orange, New Jersey
People from West Orange, New Jersey
Scientists from New Jersey
West Orange High School (New Jersey) alumni
University of Michigan alumni
American astrophysicists